The 2010–11 Football League Cup (known as the Carling Cup for sponsorship reasons) was the 51st season of the Football League Cup, a knock-out competition for the top 92 football clubs played in English football league system.

The winners were granted a place in the 2011–12 UEFA Europa League. However, in cases where a team had already gained a place in European competition via their league position or progress in other cup competitions, their place in the Europa League was deferred to the next best-placed league side not already qualified for European competitions.

Manchester United were the defending champions for the second successive season, but were knocked out in the fifth round by West Ham United.

The final was contested on 27 February 2011 between Arsenal and Birmingham City. Birmingham were the surprise 2–1 winners in the final to win just the second major trophy in their history. Birmingham City also won their first major trophy since 1963 (also a League Cup) and earned a place in European competition for the first time since 1961.

First round 
The draw for the First Round took place on 16 June 2010, with matches played two months later on 10 August 2010.

Burnley and Hull City received a First Round bye as the highest ranked teams from the previous season's league placings. The other 70 of the 72 Football League clubs competed in the First Round, divided into North and South sections. Each section was divided equally into a pot of seeded clubs and a pot of unseeded clubs. Clubs' rankings depend upon their finishing position in the 2009–10 season.

1 Score after 90 minutes

Second round 
The 13 Premier League teams not involved in European competitions entered at this stage along with the winners from the First Round plus Burnley and Hull City, who had received a First Round bye. If there is a draw at full-time there will be extra time followed by a penalty shootout if the scores are still level. From the Second Round onwards, the teams are no longer split geographically. The draw for the Second Round took place on the evening of 11 August 2010, after the First Round matches had been completed, and the matches were played in the week beginning 23 August 2010.

1 Score after 90 minutes

Third round 
The seven Premier League teams involved in European competition entered at this stage, along with the winners from the Second Round. The draw for the Third Round took place on 28 August 2010, after the Second Round games had been played. The matches were played in the week beginning 20 September 2010. Northampton Town were the only League Two side to reach this round of the tournament.

1 Score after 90 minutes

Fourth round 
The Fourth Round draw took place on 25 September 2010, and the matches were played on the week commencing 25 October 2010. For the second consecutive round, Northampton Town was the lowest ranked remaining side, being the lone representative from League Two. All four leagues involved in this competition had representation in the Fourth Round for the first time since the 2006–07 competition.

1 Score after 90 minutes

Fifth round 
Ipswich Town was the lowest ranked side left in the competition, and the sole remaining representative of the Championship in the fifth round draw, which took place on 30 October 2010. Matches were played in the week commencing 29 November 2010.

Semi-finals 
The semi-final draw took place on 1 December 2010, after the completion of the Fifth Round matches. The first leg matches were played the week commencing 10 January 2011, with the second legs a fortnight later.

First leg

Second leg 

Arsenal won 3–1 on aggregate.

Birmingham City won 4–3 on aggregate.

Final 

The final was played at Wembley Stadium, London, on Sunday, 27 February 2011.

Prize money 
The prize money was awarded by the Football League. The winners of the League Cup won £100,000 and the runners-up won £50,000. The losing semi-finalists each took home £25,000.

References

External links 

 Official Carling Cup website
 Carling Cup News at football-league.co.uk
 Carling Cup at bbc.co.uk

 
EFL Cup seasons
Football League Cup
Cup